William Nicolas Hutton (born 21 May 1950) is a British journalist. As of 2022, he writes a regular column for The Observer, co-chairs the Purposeful Company, and is the president-designate of the Academy of Social Sciences. He is the chair of the advisory board of the UK National Youth Corps. He was principal of Hertford College, University of Oxford from 2011 to 2020, and co-founder of the Big Innovation Centre, an initiative from the Work Foundation (formerly the Industrial Society), having been chief executive of the Work Foundation from 2000 to 2008. He was formerly editor-in-chief for The Observer.

Early life
Although born in Woolwich, where his father had worked at the Royal Ordnance factory (Royal Arsenal), Hutton began his education in Scotland. He went to Bishopton Primary School in Bishopton, Renfrewshire, then Paisley Grammar School when he was eight. His father moved to Bromley, then to Kent, and he attended Southborough Lane County Primary School in Petts Wood.

Hutton studied at Chislehurst and Sidcup Grammar School in Sidcup, where he was introduced to A level economics by a teacher, Garth Pinkney. He only got average marks at O-level but enjoyed the sixth form more, studying geography, history, and economics. He also organised the school tennis team. After studying sociology and economics at the University of Bristol, gaining a BSocSc (2.1), he started his career as an equity salesman for a brokerage firm, before leaving to study for an MBA at INSEAD at Fontainebleau near Paris.

Career

Hutton moved on to work in television and radio. He spent ten years with the BBC, including working as economics correspondent for Newsnight from 1983 to 1988, where he replaced Peter Hobday. He spent four years as editor-in-chief at The Observer and director of the Guardian National Newspapers, before joining the Industrial Society, now known as The Work Foundation, as chief executive in 2000. In 2010, he was criticised for his handling of the Industrial Society by a number of publications, including The Sunday Times and Private Eye, for having used the company for campaigning purposes rather than focusing on it as a business enterprise. Under Hutton's management, The Work Foundation became insolvent and was wound up. It was then sold to Lancaster University.

As well as a columnist, author, and chief executive, Hutton is a governor of the London School of Economics, a visiting professor at the University of Manchester Business School and the University of Bristol, a visiting fellow at Mansfield College, Oxford, a shareholder of the Scott Trust Limited, which owns the Guardian Media Group, rapporteur of the Kok Group, and a member of the Design Council's Millennium Commission. In March 2011, he was appointed as Principal of Hertford College, Oxford, taking up the post later in the year and retiring in 2020. He sits on the European Advisory Board of Princeton University Press.

Writing
As an author, Hutton's best-known and most influential works are The State We're In (an economic and political look at Britain in the 1990s from a social democratic point of view) and The World We're In, in which he expands his focus to include the relationship between the United States and Europe, emphasising cultural and social differences between the two blocs and analysing the UK as sitting between the two. Hutton argues in The World We're In that many viewpoints in this book are neo-Keynesean and that it is critical of short-termism, viewing stakeholder capitalism as an alternative.

Hutton's book The Writing on the Wall was released in the UK in January 2007. The book examines Western concerns and responses to the rise of China and the emerging global division of labour, and argues that the Chinese economy is running up against a set of increasingly unsustainable contradictions that could have a damaging universal fallout. On 18 February 2007, Hutton was a featured guest on BBC's Have Your Say programme, discussing the implications of China's growth. The analysis in his books is characterised by a support for the European Union and its potential, alongside a disdain for what he calls American conservatism —defined, among other factors, as a certain attitude to markets, property, and the social contract. In 1992, he won the What The Papers Say award for Political Journalist of the Year. In 2003, he was made an honorary Doctor of Laws (LLD) by the University of Bristol.

In 2010, he published Them and Us: Changing Britain – Why We Need a Fair Society.

His latest book, How Good We Can Be: Ending the Mercenary Society and Building a Great Country, saw publication in 2015.

Personal life
Hutton married Jane Atkinson, the daughter of a neurosurgeon, in 1978, and lives in London. They have two daughters and a son. His wife, who died in 2016, was a director of a property development company called First Premise, based in Richmond upon Thames, which she founded in 1987. Hutton calls himself an agnostic.

Bibliography

Major works
 How Good We Can Be: Ending the Mercenary Society and Building a Great Country  (2015) 
 Them and Us: Changing Britain – Why We Need a Fair Society (2010) 
 The Writing on the Wall: China and the West in the 21st Century (2007) 
 A Declaration of Interdependence: Why America Should Join the World (W.W. Norton & Company, 2003) 
 The World We're In (2002) 
 Global Capitalism (2000) Will Hutton (editor), Anthony Giddens (editor) 
 On the Edge: Essays on a Runaway World (2000) Anthony Giddens (editor), Will Hutton (editor) 
 The Stakeholding Society: Writings on Politics and Economics (1998) 
 The State to Come (1997) 
 The State We're In: Why Britain Is in Crisis and How to Overcome It (1995) 
 The Revolution That Never Was: An Assessment of Keynesian Economics (1986)

Contributions to other books
 Trust: From Socrates to Spin (2004) Kieron O'Hara, Will Hutton (introduction)

Awards and honours
 1996: Honorary Doctor of Letters, Kingston University
 1999: Honorary Degree, Staffordshire University
 2003: Honorary Doctor of Laws, University of Bristol
 2003: Honorary Doctor of Laws, Glasgow Caledonian University
 2006: Honorary Doctor of Civil Law, University of East Anglia
 2011: Honorary Doctorate, Middlesex University
 2011: Honorary Fellowship, University of Central Lancashire
 2013: Honorary Doctor of Laws, University of Greenwich
 2014: Honorary Doctor of Letters, York St John University

References

External links
  China and the West in the 21st Century 1 June 2007 speech at the Australian National University
 The Observer columns by Will Hutton
 Will Hutton's Profile at the London Speaker Bureau
 
 
 
 The Great Debate: What Is Radical Politics Today? Discussion with Anthony Giddens and Jonathan Pugh, December 2008
 Lateline - 18-Apr-2011 Hutton in April 2011 Lateline on China's economic bubble.
 Lateline - 15-Oct-2008 Interview with Tony Jones in October 2008.

1950 births
Living people
Alumni of the University of Bristol
BBC newsreaders and journalists
British business writers
British economists
British male journalists
British social democrats
Economic historians
English people of Scottish descent
INSEAD alumni
People associated with the London School of Economics
People educated at Paisley Grammar School
People educated at Chislehurst and Sidcup Grammar School
People from Sidcup
People from Woolwich
Principals of Hertford College, Oxford
The Observer people
English agnostics